The 2017 Yale Bulldogs football team represented Yale University in the 2017 NCAA Division I FCS football season, winning the Ivy League title. The season marked the Bulldogs' 145th overall season. The team played its home games at Yale Bowl in New Haven, Connecticut and were led by sixth-year head coach Tony Reno. They finished the season 9–1 overall and 6–1 in Ivy League play to become Ivy League champions for the first time since 2006 (when they shared the title) and to earn their first sole league title since 1980. Yale averaged 18,939 fans per game.

Schedule
The 2017 season consisted of five home games and five away games. The Bulldogs hosted Ivy League foes Cornell, Columbia, Brown, and Harvard for the 134th edition of The Game, and traveled to Dartmouth, Penn, and Princeton.

Yale's non-conference opponents were Lehigh, Fordham, and Holy Cross, all of the Patriot League.

Game summaries

Lehigh

Cornell

Fordham

Dartmouth

Holy Cross

Penn

Columbia

Brown

Princeton

Harvard ("The Game")

References

Yale
Yale Bulldogs football seasons
Ivy League football champion seasons
Yale Bulldogs football